Vitaliy Hemeha (born 10 January 1994) is a professional Ukrainian football midfielder.

Career
Born in Stepanky, a tiny village in Vinnytsia Oblast, Vitaliy began playing football in Vinnytsia, where he attended PFC Nyva Vinnytsia football school. When he was eleven, Hemeha moved to Kyiv, where he began playing for FC Dynamo Kyiv youth and reserve squads.

References

External links
 
 Club profile
 

1994 births
Living people
Ukrainian footballers
Ukrainian Premier League players
Ukrainian First League players
Ukrainian Second League players
FC Dynamo-2 Kyiv players
FC Hoverla Uzhhorod players
Wisła Płock players
FC Olimpik Donetsk players
FC Rukh Lviv players
FC Nyva Vinnytsia players
Ukrainian expatriate footballers
Expatriate footballers in Poland
Ukrainian expatriate sportspeople in Poland
Ekstraklasa players
Association football midfielders
Sportspeople from Vinnytsia Oblast